Perálec is a municipality and village in Chrudim District in the Pardubice Region of the Czech Republic. It has about 200 inhabitants.

Administrative parts
The village of Kutřín is an administrative part of Perálec.

References

External links

Villages in Chrudim District